Thomas Briceño (born 16 September 1993) is a Chilean judoka.

He competed at the 2016 Summer Olympics in Rio de Janeiro, in the men's 90 kg.

References

External links
 
 

1993 births
Living people
Chilean male judoka
Olympic judoka of Chile
Judoka at the 2016 Summer Olympics
South American Games bronze medalists for Chile
South American Games medalists in judo
Competitors at the 2018 South American Games
Judoka at the 2019 Pan American Games
Pan American Games medalists in judo
Pan American Games gold medalists for Chile
Medalists at the 2019 Pan American Games
20th-century Chilean people
21st-century Chilean people